Leon Lukman (born October 27, 1931) is a retired Serbian pole vaulter who represented SFR Yugoslavia at the 1960 Summer Olympics and won 9th place. He was a member of the Athletics Club Red Star Belgrade. He was born in Kragujevac.

References 
 Biography at sports references.come

1931 births
Living people
Serbian male pole vaulters
Yugoslav male pole vaulters
Athletes (track and field) at the 1960 Summer Olympics
Olympic athletes of Yugoslavia
Sportspeople from Kragujevac